Telvin Trishaun Smith Sr. (born April 11, 1991) is a former American football linebacker. He played college football at Florida State and was drafted by the Jacksonville Jaguars in the fifth round of the 2014 NFL Draft. Smith played his entire professional career with the Jaguars before retiring after the 2018 season.

High school career
Smith attended Lowndes High School in Valdosta, Georgia, where he played football and ran track. In football, he registered 84 tackles and two interceptions as a senior for the Vikings. As a junior, he recorded 97 tackles, including 16 for loss and two interceptions, helping his team win the state AAAAA championship.

In track & field, Smith competed in sprints and relays for the Vikings in 2009. At the Region 1AAAAA Meet, he placed 5th in the 400-meter dash event, recording a personal-best time of 51.00 seconds, and ran a leg on the Lowndes 4 × 100 m (42.50 seconds) and 4 × 400 m (3:25.05 minutes) relay squads.

Considered a four-star recruit by Rivals.com, he was rated as the 18th best outside linebacker prospect in the nation.

College career
Smith attended Florida State University from 2010 to 2013. As a true freshman in 2010, he played in all 14 games, recording 18 tackles and 1.5 sacks. As a sophomore, he played in 12 games with one start. He had 42 tackles with three sacks and one interception. As a junior in 2012, he played in all 14 games, recording 64 tackles and one sack. After three years as a backup, he took over as a starter in 2013. He led the Seminole's defense with 75 tackles, 9.5 tackles for losses, and three interceptions, two that he returned for touchdown. He was named first-team All-ACC.

Professional career
On January 21, 2014, it was announced that Smith would play in the 2014 Senior Bowl as part of Jacksonville Jaguars' head coach Gus Bradley's South team. On January 25, 2014, Smith made five combined tackles and had a tackle for a loss with South teammate Deandre Coleman as the South defeated the North 20–10. Smith went on to attend the NFL Scouting Combine in Indianapolis, Indiana and was one of 35 collegiate linebackers performing. He performed the majority of combine drills, but opted to skip the bench press, short shuttle, and three-cone drill. Smith finished second among all participating linebackers in the 40-yard dash and tied for 12th in the broad jump. On March 18, 2014, he attended Florida State's pro day and performed the short shuttle, three-cone drill, and positional drills for scouts and team representatives from all 32 NFL teams, including head coaches Mike Tomlin (Steelers), Chip Kelly (Eagles), Jim Caldwell (Lions), and Mike Zimmer (Vikings).

2014
The Jacksonville Jaguars selected Smith in the fifth round (144th overall) of the 2014 NFL Draft. He was the 17th linebacker selected in 2014.

On May 27, 2014, the Jacksonville Jaguars signed Smith to a four-year, $2.43 million contract that includes a signing bonus of $211,052.

Throughout training camp, Smith competed against Geno Hayes, LaRoy Reynolds, and Dekoda Watson for a job as one of the starting outside linebackers. He became the frontrunner for the starting weakside linebacker job after Dekoda Watson started camp on the Physically unable to Perform list (PUP) due to a sports hernia injury. Head coach Gus Bradley named Smith the backup outside linebacker behind starters Geno Hayes and LaRoy Reynolds to start the regular season.

He made his professional regular season debut in the Jacksonville Jaguars' season-opener at the Philadelphia Eagles and recorded three combined tackles during a 34–17 loss. The following week, Smith recorded five combined tackles and made his first career sack on quarterback Kirk Cousins as the Jaguars were routed at the Washington Redskins 41–10. On October 19, 2014, Smith collected four combined tackles, broke up two passes, and returned his first career interception off Brian Hoyer for 15-yards in a 24–6 victory against the Cleveland Browns. As a result, he earned his first AFC Defensive Player of the Week honors. The following week, Smith earned his first career start and collected five combined tackles and a pass deflection during a 27–13 loss to the Miami Dolphins in Week 8. In Week 12, Smith recorded 13 combined tackles during the Jaguars' 23–3 loss at the Indianapolis Colts. It marked Smith's first career game with double digit tackles on defense. On December 28, 2014, he made a season-high 16 combined tackles during a 23–17 loss at the Houston Texans. He played 705 defensive snaps on defense, ranking second among Jaguars' linebackers behind only J. T. Thomas (714 snaps).

2015
Smith entered the 2015 regular season as the starting weakside linebacker along with Dan Skuta and starting middle linebacker Paul Posluszny.

On October 11, 2015, Smith recorded a season-high 14 combined tackles during a 38–31 loss to the Tampa Bay Buccaneers.
In Week 7, he made two combined tackles, a season-high three pass deflections, and returned an interception off a pass by former FSU teammate E. J. Manuel for a 26-yard touchdown during a 34–31 victory against the Buffalo Bills. His performance against the Bills earned him AFC Defensive Player of the Week honors and marked his first career touchdown. In Week 10, Smith made 12 combined tackles in the Jaguars' 22–20 victory at the Baltimore Ravens. On December 20, 2015, he recorded six solo tackles during a 23–17 loss to the Atlanta Falcons. He left in the third quarter after sustaining a separated shoulder and dislocated finger that sidelined him for the last two games of the season (Weeks 16-17). Smith finished the 2016 season with a career-high 128 combined tackles (99 solo), seven pass deflections, 2.5 sacks, and an interception in 14 games and 14 starts. He was ranked 83rd on the NFL Top 100 Players of 2016.

2016
On January 5, 2016, the Jacksonville Jaguars reportedly fired defensive coordinator Bob Babich after the Jaguars' defense finished 31st in points per a game and 26th in points per game in 2014. On January 22, 2016, the Jaguars' promoted defensive line coach/run game coordinator Todd Wash to defensive coordinator. Head coach Gus Bradley named Smith the starting weakside linebacker along with Dan Skuta and starting middle linebacker Paul Posluszny to begin the regular season.

In Week 8, Smith recorded 15 combined tackles (ten solo) during a 36–22 loss at the Tennessee Titans. On December 4, 2016, Smith made six solo tackles and sacked quarterback Trevor Siemian as the Jaguars lost 20–10 to the Denver Broncos. On December 18, 2016, he collected eight combined tackles, a pass deflection, and intercepted a pass by Brock Osweiler in the Jaguars' 21–20 loss at the Houston Texans. Following their loss to the Texans, head coach Gus Bradley was fired and assistant head coach/offensive line coach Doug Marrone was promoted to interim head coach. Smith finished the 2016 season with 118 combined tackles (98 solo), eight pass deflections, two interceptions, and a sack in 16 games and 16 starts.

2017
On January 9, 2017, the Jaguars named Doug Marrone their permanent head coach and retained Todd Wash as their defensive coordinator. Smith, Posluszny, and Myles Jack all remained the starting linebackers entering the regular season.

On September 17, 2017, Smith intercepted quarterback Marcus Mariota to stop a drive that was in Jaguars' territory in a 37–16 loss to the Tennessee Titans. In Week 5, Smith recorded ten combined tackles, broke up a pass, and returned an interception by quarterback Ben Roethlisberger for a 28-yard touchdown in the Jaguars' 30–9 victory at the Pittsburgh Steelers. His performance in Week 5 earned him AFC Defensive Player of the Week.

On October 25, 2017, the Jacksonville Jaguars signed Smith to a four-year, $45.05 million contract extension that includes $15.05 million guaranteed and a signing bonus of $4.05 million. On December 3, 2017, Smith recorded seven combined tackles during a 27–24 loss at the Arizona Cardinals, but left in the third quarter after sustaining a concussion. He missed the following two weeks (Weeks 13-14) while he remained in concussion protocol. Smith finished the season with 102 combined tackles (76 solo), five pass deflections, three interceptions, one touchdown, and one sack in 14 games and 14 starts. On January 22, 2018, it was announced that Smith would play in the 2018 Pro Bowl as a late replacement for Jadeveon Clowney. He was ranked 67th by his peers on the NFL Top 100 Players of 2018.

The Jacksonville Jaguars finished first in the AFC South with a 10–6 record and earned a playoff berth. On January 7, 2018, Smith recorded nine combined tackles during a 10–3 win against the Buffalo Bills in the AFC Wildcard Game. The following week, he made 16 combined tackles (14 solo), deflected a pass, and returned a fumble recovery by Ben Roethlisberger for a 50-yard touchdown during the second quarter of their 45–42 victory at the Pittsburgh Steelers in the AFC Divisional Round. On January 21, 2018, Smith recorded eight solo tackles and two pass deflections as the Jaguars lost the AFC Championship Game 24–20 at the New England Patriots.

2018

Head coach Doug Marrone retained Smith as the starting weakside linebacker in 2018. He started alongside Leon Jacobs and middle linebacker Myles Jack. In Week 5, Smith collected a season-high 13 combined tackles (seven solo) during a 30–14 loss at the Kansas City Chiefs. On December 23, 2018, Smith recorded six combined tackles, deflected a pass, and returned an interception for the third touchdown of his career during a 17–7 win at the Miami Dolphins in Week 16. Smith intercepted a pass by Dolphins’ quarterback Ryan Tannehill, that was initially intended for running back Kalen Ballage, and returned it for a 33-yard touchdown during the fourth quarter. He started in all 16 games in 2018 and recorded a career-high 134 combined tackles (100 solo), two pass deflections, two interceptions, one sack, one forced fumble, and a touchdown. He received an overall grade of 65.2 from Pro Football Focus, which ranked 44th among all linebackers in 2018.

On May 9, 2019, Smith announced via Instagram that he would not be playing football in the 2019 season, citing the need to "get his world in order". He was placed on the team's reserve/retired list on July 24, 2019.

NFL statistics

Regular season

Postseason

Personal
Police were called to Smith's home on November 27, 2019, to execute a search warrant. On April 29, 2020, Smith was arrested on charges of unlawful sexual contact with a minor in Jacksonville, Florida. He pleaded not guilty. On May 21, 2021, Smith pleaded no contest for his unlawful sexual activity. He received three years of probation, and was ordered to undergo psychosexual counseling. In addition, he was prohibited from contacting any women 18 years of age or younger that were not in his family unless evaluators or counselors approved it.

References

External links
Florida State Seminoles bio

1991 births
Living people
People from Valdosta, Georgia
Players of American football from Georgia (U.S. state)
American football linebackers
Florida State University alumni
Florida State Seminoles football players
Jacksonville Jaguars players
American Conference Pro Bowl players